The 1952 West Riding County Council election was held on Saturday, 5 April 1952. The election took place in the administrative county of the West Riding of Yorkshire, which excluded the county boroughs of Barnsley, Bradford, Dewsbury, Doncaster, Halifax, Huddersfield, Leeds, Rotherham, Sheffield, Wakefield and York. The whole council of ninety-six members was up for election, with each county electoral division returning one councillor.

After the election the composition of the council was;
Labour Party: 61
Conservative Party: 28
Independents: 4
Liberal Party: 3

Results by division

Adwick-le-Street

Aireborough

Askern

Aston

Baildon

Barnoldswick

Barwick

Batley No. 1

Batley No. 2

Bentley

Birstall

Bingley

Brighouse North

Brighouse South

Castleford No. 1

Castleford No. 2

Colne Valley No. 1

Colne Valley No. 2

Conisborough

Craven

Crofton

Cudworth

Dalton

Darfield and Thurnscoe

Darton

Dearne

Denby Dale

Ecclesfield

Edlington

Elland

Featherstone

Garforth

Goole

Harrogate No. 1

Harrogate No. 2

Harrogate No. 3

Hatfield and Stainforth

Hebden Bridge

Heckmondwike

Hemsworth

Holmfirth

Horbury

Horsforth

Hoyland

Ilkley

Keighley No. 1

Keighley No. 2

Keighley No. 3

Kirkburton

Kiveton Park

Knaresborough

Knottingley

Maltby and Tickhill

Mexborough

Mirfield

Morley No. 1

Morley No. 2

Normanton

Ossett

Otley

Pateley Bridge

Penistone

Pontefract

Pudsey No. 1

Pudsey No. 2

Queensbury

Rawmarsh

Ripon

Ripponden

Rossington

Rothwell

Saddleworth

Sedbergh

Selby

Settle

Silsden

Shipley East

Shipley West

Skipton

Snaith

South Elmsall

South Kirkby

Sowerby Bridge

Spenborough No. 1

Spenborough No. 2

Stanley

Stocksbridge

Swinton

Tadcaster

Thorne

Todmorden

Wath-on-Dearne

Wetherby

Whitwood

Wombwell

Worsborough

References 

1952
1952 English local elections
1950s in Yorkshire
April 1952 events in the United Kingdom